Petrophile heterophylla, commonly known as the variable-leaved conebush, is a species of flowering plant in the family Proteaceae and is endemic to southwestern Western Australia. It is a shrub with variably shaped, sometimes pinnately-divided leaves, and oval heads of silky-hairy, yellow to cream-coloured flowers.

Description

Taxonomy
Petrophile heterophylla was first formally described in 1840 by John Lindley in A Sketch of the Vegetation of the Swan River Colony. The specific epithet (heterophylla) means "different-leaved".

Distribution and habitat
This petrophile grows in low heath, dense scrub, open woodland and forest in the Stirling Range, east to an area between Ravensthorpe and Esperance and north to near Chittering, in the southwest of Western Australia.

Conservation status
Petrophile heterophylla is classified as "not threatened" by the Government of Western Australia Department of Parks and Wildlife.

References

heterophylla
Eudicots of Western Australia
Endemic flora of Western Australia
Plants described in 1840
Taxa named by John Lindley